Local color/colour may refer to:

Local Color (book), a 1950 note and sketch study by Truman Capote
Local Color (Mose Allison album), 1958
Local Color (University of Northern Iowa Jazz Band One album), 2015
Local Color (film), a 2006 film starring Trevor Morgan
Local color (visual art), the natural color of an object
Local Colour: Travels in the Other Australia, a 1994 book by Bill Bachman and Tim Winton
Local Color, a short-story collection by John Andrew Rice
Local Color, an art exhibition by Tullio DeSantis
American literary regionalism, also called local color, a style or genre of writing

See also
Regionalism (disambiguation)